Curupaytí is an Argentine rugby union club. The squad currently plays in Primera División A, the second division of the Unión de Rugby de Buenos Aires league system.

History
The idea of forming a club dedicated exclusively to the practise of rugby union was originated in 1924, after the GEBA team arrived to play a match which had to be postponed due to a horse riding was being held on the rugby field.

After some met were celebrated, twelve former GEBA players founded Club Curupaytí. The name was chosen honoring the Asalto de Curupaytí, an attack of Argentine troops over the Paraguayan fort of Curupaytí, during the Paraguayan War (also called "War of the Triple Alliance")

References

External links
Official website

Argentine rugby union teams
Rugby clubs established in 1924